The Church of the Irish Martyrs is a Catholic church in the parish of Aughaninshin in the Ballyraine area of Letterkenny, County Donegal, Ireland.

History
In 1990 plans were drawn up for a new church project to cater for the growing population of the town. At the time it was estimated that a church capable of holding 800 people would be required. The church project was initiated by Bishop Anthony McFeely and opened in 1994. It was the first church in Ireland to be named after the Irish Catholic Martyrs.

An old abbey in the parish dates back to the 13th or 14th century. In 2000 it was decided to create a new parish and call it after the abbey. The site of the abbey is visible from the church, and its graveyard, which dates from 1756, is still in use to this day. The parish has a population of 6,500.

RTÉ broadcast televised masses to a national audience on Holy Thursday and Good Friday during Holy Week 1997, with coverage also in the RTÉ Guide.

 the parish priests are Fr. Brian Quinn and Fr. Brendan Ward.

Maurice Harron carved a  stone cross on the church altar, and local sculptor Redmond Herrity created a jubilee stone that can be seen on display outside the church.

Fourteen new Stations of the Cross were publicly unveiled at the Church of the Irish Martyrs on Ash Wednesday 2020, purchased at auction from St Mary's Convent in Derby and described by Quinn as "the most significant piece of artwork to come into the church". The stations, consisting of oil and gold leaf on canvas and laid down on eight metal panels, date to the late-19th century. One is inscribed Studio J Lintbout St Croix, Bruges, Belgium. The church's original stations were simple crosses above Donegal Irish, by Hugo Bonner. Then, when the Loreto Convent in Milford shut, the Church of the Irish Martyrs received their stations.

References

External links
 Official website
 Raphoe Diocese - The Parish of Aughaninshin

1994 establishments in Ireland
Buildings and structures in Letterkenny
Religion in Letterkenny
Roman Catholic churches completed in 1994
Roman Catholic churches in County Donegal
20th-century Roman Catholic church buildings in Ireland
20th-century churches in the Republic of Ireland